In the 2000s, the Belgium national football team played at Euro 2000 (which Belgium co-hosted with The Netherlands) and at the 2002 World Cup. They did not qualify for any other major tournaments.

The overall match balance is positive with 39 wins versus 34 losses (and 25 draws).

Results

98 official matches were played.

Notes

References

External links

football
2000s
2000–01 in Belgian football